Leland Milling Company, or Leland Mills, is a full-service animal feed production facility based in Spanish Fork, Utah, USA., that offers a variety of feed for most classes of livestock. The Leland Mill was constructed in November 1898 by Archibald Gardner, a 19th-century pioneer, and engineer, which still features its original timber supports and stone foundation today. Additionally, before electricity was available, the mill made use of the force of the Spanish Fork River to keep it running. The company was purchased by the Isaacs family in 1955 and is still owned by their family, four generations from the mill's change in ownership.

The mill was originally meant to provide flour and animal feed until grain processing stopped in the early 1960s. The use of cloth sacks to place and hold flour halted. As a result, the company uses sacks made of canvas-plastic material to store their products. Leland Mills is currently pushing its delivery outreach to provide feed for locations outside Utah in the Western United States.

History

1890s–1960s 

The Leland Mills site operated as a flour and animal feed manufacturing plant from the time it opened in 1898 until the mill focused solely on making animal feed in the early 1960s. In the Spring of 1898, the mill began to steadily supply the settlers of the Spanish Fork area with milled grains and opportunities for employment.

At this point in the company's history, flour was packaged into white cloth sacks rather than using paper or plastic for shipments. After being purchased, the bags were often taken apart at the seams and used to stitch clothing, such as blouses, pants, and undergarments. The fabric was also used to create household goods and products such as dishtowels, quilts, doll clothes, and milk strainers. With the expensive nature of clothing materials at this time and the lack of options, sacks were commonly used for such products.

1960s–current 
Now focusing on the creation of feed rather than flour, Leland Milling company is in the development stage for increasing the distance in which they can make deliveries of their product. As adjustments to company products have been made, so too has the use of cloth bags to carry goods diminished. Currently, canvas-plastic sacks are in use to package custom-mixed feeds.

Growth 
When asked about industry trends, Leland Mill owners mentioned that they noticed an influx of people raising chickens in their backyard, leading to an increase in the company's net income over the past few years. Leland Milling Company continues to create opportunities for their animal feed to be available, not just for large farms and ranches, but for backyard farms in and out of Utah.

Products and services

Animal feed 
Leland Milling Company custom-mixes its animal feed on site of the Leland Mill. Deliveries typically range from 1000 lbs. or more. Feed for cattle, horses, goats, chickens (including game and meat birds), sheep, hogs, dogs, and cats is produced and sold onsite.

References

External links

Animal food manufacturers
Manufactured goods
Companies based in Utah
Companies established in 1898